Niko Davin (born 19 December 1997) is a Namibian cricketer. He made his List A debut on 11 October 2015 in the CSA Provincial One-Day Challenge tournament. In January 2016 he was named in Namibia's squad for the 2016 Under-19 Cricket World Cup.

He made his first-class debut for Namibia in the 2017–18 Sunfoil 3-Day Cup on 11 January 2018. In August 2018, he was named in Namibia's squad for the 2018 Africa T20 Cup. In October 2018, he was named in Namibia's squad in the Southern sub region group for the 2018–19 ICC World Twenty20 Africa Qualifier tournament in Botswana.

In May 2019, he was named in Namibia's squad for the Regional Finals of the 2018–19 ICC T20 World Cup Africa Qualifier tournament in Uganda. He made his Twenty20 International (T20I) debut for Namibia against Ghana on 20 May 2019. He was the leading run-scorer for Namibia in the Regional Finals, with 86 runs in three matches.

In June 2019, he was one of twenty-five cricketers to be named in Cricket Namibia's Elite Men's Squad ahead of the 2019–20 international season. In September 2019, he was named in Namibia's squad for the 2019 ICC T20 World Cup Qualifier tournament in the United Arab Emirates.

References

External links
 

1997 births
Living people
Namibian cricketers
Namibia Twenty20 International cricketers
Place of birth missing (living people)